Quinton Aaron (born August 15, 1984) is an American actor. He made his film debut in Michel Gondry's Be Kind Rewind. His first lead role was as Michael Oher in the 2009 film The Blind Side.

Early life
Aaron was born in The Bronx, New York City, but moved to Augusta, Georgia after elementary school.

Career
Aaron made his film debut as Q in Michel Gondry's Be Kind Rewind, starring Mos Def and Jack Black. He co-starred in an NYU thesis short film called Mr. Brooklyn with Al Thompson (Liberty Kid, A Walk to Remember), directed by Jason Sokoloff.Aaron has appeared in two episodes of the TV show Law & Order (Season 17, episode "Bling" as a bodyguard and episode "Fallout" as a bouncer and episode s11e17 "Disabled").

His first lead role was playing Michael Oher, alongside Sandra Bullock and Tim McGraw in The Blind Side, released November 20, 2009. Directed by John Lee Hancock, the film was adapted from Michael Lewis's 2006 book The Blind Side: Evolution of a Game, which features Oher's real-life story. Oher had started in ten games as a guard during his first season with the Ole Miss Rebels, becoming a first-team freshman All-American, and later an American football offensive tackle for the Baltimore Ravens. Aaron auditioned for the role after his mother found out about the casting call online. Chosen as a finalist, he was flown in to Los Angeles for the final audition. Unsure whether he had been successful, he reached into his pocket on his way to the door and pulled out a card, telling director John Lee Hancock that he knew that it was a long shot for him to get the part, but that he did security work and would love to provide those services should they be needed for the film. Director Hancock said that he would keep it in mind.

On March 24, 2010, Aaron guest-starred with Jill Scott in an episode of Law & Order: Special Victims Unit. On April 28, 2010, Quinton guest-starred in the "We All Saw This Coming" episode of Mercy. On April 4, 2011 Quinton guest-starred in the season finale of Harry's Law with his The Blind Side co-star Kathy Bates.

During the 2010 Major League Baseball All-Star Game, Aaron participated in the Taco Bell Legends and Celebrities Softball Game as a victorious American Leaguer.

In 2015, Aaron shot the film Busy Day'' in Albuquerque, New Mexico.

Filmography

Film

Television

Music videos

References

External links

Quinton Aaron on Instagram
Quinton Aaron on Twitter

1984 births
Living people
Male actors from New York City
African-American male actors
American male television actors
Male actors from Augusta, Georgia
Male actors from Georgia (U.S. state)
21st-century American male actors
American male film actors
Entertainers from the Bronx
Male actors from Tampa, Florida
21st-century African-American people
20th-century African-American people